Gustavo Sánchez Martínez (born 3 May 1994, in Mexico City) is a Mexican competitive swimmer, born without left hand and both legs, who won four medals for Mexico at the 2012 Summer Paralympics. He competed in five events, 50m freestyle (5th place), 100m freestyle (1st place), 200m freestyle (1st place), 150m medley (2nd place), 50m backstroke (3rd place). Gustavo became well known at World Championships in Eindhoven, Netherlands, 2010, where he won three bronze medals. His biggest rivals in the pools are David Smetanine from France and Richard Oribe from Spain.

At the Rio 2016 Paralympic Games, his five swim finals resulted in no medals.

Notes

References

External links 
 
 Gustavo Sanchez Martinez - Montreal 2013 IPC Swimming World Championships at the International Paralympic Committee

1994 births
Living people
Mexican male freestyle swimmers
S4-classified Paralympic swimmers
Paralympic swimmers of Mexico
Paralympic gold medalists for Mexico
Paralympic silver medalists for Mexico
Paralympic bronze medalists for Mexico
Swimmers at the 2012 Summer Paralympics
Swimmers at the 2016 Summer Paralympics
Medalists at the 2012 Summer Paralympics
Swimmers from Mexico City
Medalists at the World Para Swimming Championships
Paralympic medalists in swimming
Medalists at the 2011 Parapan American Games
Medalists at the 2015 Parapan American Games
Medalists at the 2019 Parapan American Games
Swimmers at the 2020 Summer Paralympics
Mexican male backstroke swimmers
Mexican male breaststroke swimmers
Mexican male butterfly swimmers
Mexican male medley swimmers
20th-century Mexican people
21st-century Mexican people